The Shanghainese language, also known as the Shanghai dialect, or Hu language, is a variety of Wu Chinese spoken in the central districts of the City of Shanghai and its surrounding areas. It is classified as part of the Sino-Tibetan language family. Shanghainese, like the rest of the Wu language group, is mutually unintelligible with other varieties of Chinese, such as Mandarin.

Shanghainese belongs a separate group of the Taihu Wu subgroup. With nearly 14 million speakers, Shanghainese is also the largest single form of Wu Chinese. Since the late 19th century it has served as the lingua franca of the entire Yangtze River Delta region, but in recent decades its status has declined relative to Mandarin, which most Shanghainese speakers can also speak.

Like other Wu varieties, Shanghainese is rich in vowels and consonants, with around twenty unique vowel qualities, twelve of which are phonemic. Similarly, Shanghainese also has voiced obstruent initials, which is rare outside of Wu and Xiang varieties. Shanghainese also has a low number of tones compared to other languages in Southern China, and has a system of tone sandhi similar to Japanese pitch accent.

History 

The speech of Shanghai had long been influenced by those spoken around Jiaxing, then Suzhou during the Qing Dynasty. Suzhounese literature, Chuanqi, Tanci, and folk songs all influenced early Shanghainese.

During the 1850s, the port of Shanghai was opened, and a large number of migrants entered the city. This led to many loanwords from both the West and the East, especially from Ningbonese, and like Cantonese in Hong Kong, English. In fact, "speakers of other Wu dialects traditionally treat the Shanghai vernacular somewhat contemptuously as a mixture of Suzhou and Ningbo dialects." This has led to Shanghainese becoming one of the fastest-developing languages of the Wu Chinese subgroup, undergoing rapid changes and quickly replacing Suzhounese as the prestige dialect of the Yangtze River Delta region. It underwent sustained growth that reached a peak in the 1930s during the Republican era, when migrants arrived in Shanghai and immersed themselves in the local tongue. Migrants from Shanghai also brought Shanghainese to many overseas Chinese communities. As of 2016, 83.4 thousand people in Hong Kong are still able to speak Shanghainese. Shanghainese is sometimes viewed as a tool to discriminate against immigrants. Migrants who move from other Chinese cities to Shanghai have little ability to speak Shanghainese. Among the migrant people, some believe Shanghainese represents the superiority of native Shanghainese people. Some also believe that native residents intentionally speak Shanghainese in some places to discriminate against the immigrant population to transfer their anger to migrant workers, who take over their homeland and take advantage of housing, education, medical, and job resources.

After the People's Republic of China's government imposed and promoted Standard Chinese as the official language of all of China, Shanghainese has started its decline. During the Chinese economic reform of 1978, Shanghainese has once again took in a large number of migrants. Due to the prominence of Standard Mandarin, learning Shanghainese was no longer necessary for migrants. However, Shanghainese remained a vital part of the city's culture and retained its prestige status within the local population. In the 1990s, it was still common for local radio and television broadcasts to be in Shanghainese. For example, in 1995, the TV series Sinful Debt featured extensive Shanghainese dialogue; when it was broadcast outside Shanghai (mainly in adjacent Wu-speaking areas) Mandarin subtitles were added. The Shanghainese TV series Lao Niang Jiu ("Old Uncle") was broadcast from 1995 to 2007 and was popular among Shanghainese residents. Shanghainese programming has since slowly declined amid regionalist-localist accusations. From 1992 onward, Shanghainese use was discouraged in schools, and many children native to Shanghai can no longer speak Shanghainese. In addition, Shanghai's emergence as a cosmopolitan global city consolidated the status of Mandarin as the standard language of business and services, at the expense of the local language.

Since 2005, movements have emerged to protect Shanghainese. At municipal legislative discussions in 2005, former Shanghai opera actress Ma Lili moved to "protect" the language, stating that she was one of the few remaining Shanghai opera actresses who still retained authentic classic Shanghainese pronunciation in their performances. Shanghai's former party boss Chen Liangyu, a native Shanghainese himself, reportedly supported her proposal. Shanghainese has been reintegrated into pre-kindergarten education, with education of native folk songs and rhymes, as well as a Shanghainese-only day on Fridays in the Modern Baby Kindergarten. Professor Qian Nairong is working on efforts to save the language. In response to criticism, Qian reminds people that Shanghainese was once fashionable, saying, "the popularization of Mandarin doesn't equal the ban of dialects. It doesn't make Mandarin a more civilized language either. Promoting dialects is not a narrow-minded localism, as it has been labeled by some netizens". Professor Qian has also urged for Shanghainese to be taught in other sectors of education, due to kindergarten and university courses being insufficient.

During the 2010s, many achievements have been made to preserve Shanghainese. In 2011, Hu Baotan wrote Longtang ("Longtang"), the first ever Shanghainese novel. In June 2012, a new television program airing in Shanghainese was created. In 2013, buses in Shanghai started using Shanghainese broadcasts. In 2017, Apple's iOS 11 introduced Siri in Shanghainese, being only the third Sinitic language to be supported, after Standard Mandarin and Cantonese. In 2018, the Japanese-Chinese animated anthology drama film Flavors of Youth had a section set in Shanghai, with significant Shanghainese dialogue. In January 2019, singer Lin Bao released the first Shanghainese pop record Shanghai Yao ("Shanghai Ballad"). In December 2021, the Shanghainese-language romantic comedy movie Myth of Love was released. Its box office revenue was ¥260 million, and response was generally positive.

Today, around half the population of Shanghai can converse in Shanghainese, and a further quarter can understand it. Though the number of speakers has been declining, a large number of people want to preserve it.

Status 
Due to the large number of ethnic groups of China, efforts to establish a common language have been attempted many times. Therefore, the language issue has always been an important part of Beijing's rule. Other than the government language-management efforts, the rate of rural-to-urban migration in China has also accelerated the shift to Standard Chinese and the disappearance of native languages and dialects in the urban areas.

As more people moved into Shanghai, the economic center of China, Shanghainese has been threatened despite it originally being a strong topolect of Wu Chinese. According to the Shanghai Municipal Statistics Bureau, the population of Shanghai was estimated to be 24.28 million in 2019, of whom 14.5 million are permanent residents and 9.77 million are migrant residents. To have better communication with foreign residents and develop a top-level financial center among the world, the promotion of the official language, Standard Mandarin, became very important. Therefore, the Shanghai Municipal Government banned the use of Shanghainese in public places, schools, and work. Around half of the city's population is unaware of these policies.

A survey of students from the primary school in 2010 indicated that 52.3% of students believed Mandarin is easier than Shanghainese for communication, and 47.6% of the students choose to speak Mandarin because it is a mandatory language at school. Furthermore, 68.3% of the students are more willing to study Mandarin, but only 10.2% of the students are more willing to study Shanghainese. A survey in 2021 has shown that 15.22% of respondents under 18 would never use Shanghainese. The study also found that the percentage of people that would use Shanghainese with older family members has halved. The study also shows that around one third of people under the age of 30 can only understand Shanghainese, and 8.7% of respondents under 18 cannot even understand it. The number of people that are able to speak Shanghainese has also consistently decreased.

Much of the youth can no longer speak Shanghainese fluently because they had no chance to practice it at school. Also, they were unwilling to communicate with their parents in Shanghainese, which has accelerated its decline. The survey in 2010 indicated that 62.6% of primary school students use Mandarin as the first language at home, but only 17.3% of them use Shanghainese to communicate with their parents.

However, the same study from 2021 has shown that more than 90% of all age groups except 18-29 want to preserve Shanghainese. 87.06% of people have noted that the culture of Shanghai cannot live without its language, and around half of the respondents stated that a Shanghainese citizen should be able to speak Shanghainese. More than 85% of all participants also believe that they help Shanghainese revitalization, and it would be useful to announce station names in Shanghainese on buses.

Classification 

Shanghainese macroscopically is spoken in Shanghai and parts of eastern Nantong, and constitutes the Shanghai subranch of the Northern Wu family of Wu Chinese. Some linguists group Shanghainese with nearby varieties, such as Huzhounese and Suzhounese, which has about 29%-30% lexical similarity with Standard Mandarin, into a branch known as Suhujia, due to them sharing many phonological, lexical, and grammatical similarities. Newer varieties of Shanghainese, however, have been influenced by standard Chinese as well as Cantonese and other varieties, making the Shanghainese idiolects spoken by young people in the city different from that spoken by the older population. Also, the practice of inserting Mandarin into Shanghainese conversations is very common, at least for young people. Like most subdivisions of Chinese, it is easier for a local speaker to understand Mandarin than it is for a Mandarin speaker to understand the local language. It is also of note that Shanghainese, like other other Northern Wu languages, is not mutually intelligible with Southern Wu languages like Taizhounese and Wenzhounese.

Shanghainese as a branch of Northern Wu can be further subdivided. The details are as follows:

 Urban branch – what “Shanghainese” tends to refer to. Occupies the city centre of Shanghai, generally on the west bank of the Huangpu River. This can also be further divided into Old, Middle, and New Periods, as well as an emerging Newest Period.

The following are often collectively known as Bendihua (Shanghainese: , Wugniu: pen-di ghe-gho)

 Jiading branch – spoken in the most of Jiading and Baoshan.
 Liantang branch – spoken in the southwestern ends of Qingpu.
 Chongming branch – spoken in the islands of Hengsha, Changxing and Chongming, as well as the eastern parts of Nantong.
 Songjiang branch – spoken in all other parts of Shanghai, which can be further divided into the following:

 Pudong subbranch – spoken in all parts of the east bank of the Huangpu River, taking up most of the Pudong district.

 Shanghai subbranch – spoken in the rest of the peripheral areas of the city center, namely southern Jiading and Baoshan, as well as northern Minhang.

 Songjiang subbranch – spoken in the rest of Shanghai. Named after the Songjiang district.

Phonology 

Following conventions of Chinese syllable structure, Shanghainese syllables can be divided into initials and finals. The initial occupies the first part of the syllable. The final occupies the second part of the syllable and can be divided further into an optional medial and an obligatory rime (sometimes spelled rhyme). Tone is also a feature of the syllable in Shanghainese. Syllabic tone, which is typical to the other Sinitic languages, has largely become verbal tone in Shanghainese.

Initials 
The following is a list of all initials in Middle Period Shanghainese, as well as the Wugniu romanisation and example characters.

Shanghainese has a set of tenuis, lenis and fortis plosives and affricates, as well as a set of voiceless and voiced fricatives. Alveolo-palatal initials are also present in Shanghainese.

Voiced stops are phonetically voiceless with slack voice phonation in stressed, word initial position. This phonation (often referred to as murmur) also occurs in zero onset syllables, syllables beginning with fricatives, and syllables beginning with sonorants. These consonants are true voiced in intervocalic position. Sonorants are also suggested to be glottalised in dark tones (ie. tones 1, 5, 7).

Finals 
Being a Wu language, Shanghainese has a large array of vowel sounds. The following is a list of all possible finals in Middle Period Shanghainese, as well as the Wugniu romanisation and example characters.

The transcriptions used above are broad and the following points are of note when pertaining to actual pronunciation:
  is often rounded into .
  is only pronounced as  after labials and alveolars. whereas it is  after glottal and alveolo-palatal initials.
 High vowels in front of  can undergo breaking.
  can be merged into , resulting in one fewer rime.
 Rimes with final  is often simply realised as a shortened vowel nucleus when it is not utterance-final.
 Lips are not significantly rounded in rounded vowels, and not significantly unrounded in unrounded ones.
  are similar in pronunciation, differing slightly in lip rounding and height ( respectively).  are also similar in pronunciation, differing slightly in vowel height ( respectively).
 Medial  is pronounced  before rounded vowels.

The Middle Chinese nasal rimes are all merged in Shanghainese. Middle Chinese  rimes have become glottal stops, .

Tones 

Shanghainese has five phonetically distinguishable tones for single syllables said in isolation. These tones are illustrated below in Chao tone numbers. In terms of Middle Chinese tone designations, the dark tone category has three tones (dark rising and dark departing tones have merged into one tone), while the light category has two tones (the light level, rising and departing tones have merged into one tone).

Numbers in this table are those used by the Wugniu romanisation scheme.

The conditioning factors which led to the yin–yang (light-dark) split still exist in Shanghainese, as they do in most other Wu lects: light tones are only found with voiced initials, namely , while the dark tones are only found with voiceless initials.

The checked tones are shorter, and describe those rimes which end in a glottal stop . That is, both the yin–yang distinction and the checked tones are allophonic (dependent on syllabic structure). With this analysis, Shanghainese has only a two-way phonemic tone contrast, falling vs rising, and then only in open syllables with voiceless initials. Therefore, many romanisations of Shanghainese opt to only mark the dark level tone, usually with a diacritic such as an acute accent or grave accent.

Tone sandhi 

Tone sandhi is a process whereby adjacent tones undergo dramatic alteration in connected speech. Similar to other Northern Wu dialects, Shanghainese is characterized by two forms of tone sandhi: a word tone sandhi and a phrasal tone sandhi.

Word tone sandhi in Shanghainese can be described as left-prominent and is characterized by a dominance of the first syllable over the contour of the entire tone domain. As a result, the underlying tones of syllables other than the leftmost syllable, have no effect on the tone contour of the domain. The pattern is generally described as tone spreading (1, 5, 6, 7) or tone shifting (8, except for 4-syllable compounds, which can undergo spreading or shifting). The table below illustrates possible tone combinations.

However, the syllables in combination exhibit the light checked shifting pattern where the first-syllable light checked tone shifts to the last syllable in the domain: .

Phrasal tone sandhi in Shanghainese can be described as right-prominent and is characterized by a right syllable retaining its underlying tone and a left syllable receiving a mid-level tone based on the underlying tone's register. The table below indicates possible left syllable tones in right-prominent compounds.

Sometimes meaning can change based on whether left-prominent or right-prominent sandhi is used. When pronounced  (i.e., with right-prominent sandhi), it means "to fry noodles".

Vocabulary 
IPA transcription is for the Middle Period of modern Shanghainese, pronunciation of those between 20 and 60 years old.

Due to the large number of migrants into Shanghai, its lexicon is less noticeably Wu, though it still retains many defining features. However, many of these now lost features can be found in lects spoken in suburban Shanghai.

Shanghainese also has a multitude of loan words from European languages, due to Shanghai's status as a major port in China. Most of these terms come from English, though there are some from other languages such as French.

Common words and phrases 
 For more terms, see Shanghainese Swadesh list on Wiktionary.

Literary and vernacular pronunciations 

Like other Sinitic languages, Shanghainese exhibits a difference between expected vernacular pronunciations, and literary pronunciations taken from the Standard Mandarin of the time, be it Nanjingnese, Hangzhounese, or Beijingnese.

These readings must be distinguished in vocabulary. Take for instance the following.

Evolution 
Qian Nairong identified four distinct stages of the evolution of Shanghainese. The following sections explore the changes per stage.

Stage 1 
Stage 1 lasts from 1853 to 1899. Most sources in this period are written by western linguists.
 The  initial disappears
 The loss of nasalization of xian and shan rimes
 The merger of all checked rimes, including the allophonic 
 Terms with light rising tone and a plosive or fricative initial merge with the light departing tone

Stage 2 
Stage 2 lasts from 1900 to 1939. This period is often also known as Old Period.
 Bilabial fricatives become labiodental
 Palatalization of velars and 
  and parts of  merged into 
 Xian and shan rimes with closed openness become 
 All non-checked light tones merge
The following is a table of Old Period initials, as of the year 1915.

Stage 3 
Stage 3 lasts from 1940 to 1969. This marks the start of the Middle Period and is often seen as the standard of Shanghainese.
 The breathy voice phonation type begins to be lost
 The  initials become more distinct
 “Sharp”  and “blunt”  initials merge in front of high vowels
 The finals of lei, lai and lan merge
 The  final becomes an alternative pronunciation;  becomes dominant
  finals merge
  and  merge
  merges into  and  merges into 
 The dark rising and departing tones merge

Stage 4 
Stage 4 lasts from 1970 to 1999. The end of this period coincides with the start of the New Period.
 A  initial develops based on whether Standard Mandarin has an affricate
 The yi initial largely becomes 
 Unsystematic devoicing of voiced initials
 Xian and shan diphthong finals become monophthongs
  largely disappears
  and  merge. They are also sometimes pronounced  and 
  and  merge into ,  merges into 
  merges into ,  merges into 
 A new  initial where Standard Mandarin has 
  gets pronounced 
  and  merge

Vocabulary 
There are some recorded differences between Old Period Shanghainese and those more contemporary. The following is a selection of several.

Grammar 
Old Shanghainese grammar differs from Middle Period greatly in terms of word order and grammatical particles. Take the following sentences for example:

In terms of New Period grammar, the word order is sometimes changed to be more similar to Mandarin. Take for example the following sentences, which all mean "come over to my place and play when you have time!":

Newest Period 
Due to the decline of Shanghainese, and the increasing userbase of Standard Mandarin, Shanghainese has entered an emerging "Newest Period". The exact phonology generally varies from person to person. The following is a non-exhaustive list of phonological changes seen in Newest Period Shanghainese, and are heavily proscribed.

Initials:
 Voicing is lost in historical rising and departing tone words:   → .
 The  and some  initials are merged into the null, especially when pronouncing Written Standard Chinese:   → .
 The  initial is almost completely lost.
 The alveolo-palatal series  approach .
 The voiced initials merge with their unvoiced counterparts:   → .
 However,  gets merged into the null initial:   → .
Finals:
 Some words with the  final create a new :   → .
 Some words with the  final merge into the  final:   → .
 The  final splits into ,  and :   ≠   ≠  .
 Some words with the  final gets pronounced :   → 
 The  syllable merges into the  syllable:   =  
 The  and  finals merge:   =  
Tones:
 The two checked tones merge into the 55 contour.
 Some light departing words becoming dark rising:   → .
 4 or 5 syllable sandhi chains break into shorter 2 or 3 character chains.

Grammar 
Like other Sinitic languages, Shanghainese is an isolating language that lacks marking for tense, person, case, number or gender. Similarly, there is no distinction for tense or person in verbs, with word order and particles generally expressing these grammatical characteristics. There are, however, three important derivational processes in Shanghainese. However, some analyses do suggest that one can analyse Shanghainese to have tenses.

Although formal inflection is very rare in all varieties of Chinese, there does exist in Shanghainese a morpho-phonological tone sandhi that Zhu (2006) identifies as a form of inflection since it forms new words out of pre-existing phrases. This type of inflection is a distinguishing characteristic of all Northern Wu dialects.

Affixation, generally (but not always) taking the form of suffixes, occurs rather frequently in Shanghainese, enough so that this feature contrasts even with other Wu varieties, although the line between suffix and particle is somewhat nebulous. Most affixation applies to adjectives. In the example below, the term  (deu-sy) can be used to change an adjective to a noun.
{|
|搿||||種||骯三||頭勢||勿||||談||了！
|-
|geq||-||tson||áon-sé||deu-sy||veq||-||de||leq
|-
|this||||CL||disgusting||deu-sy||NEG||||mention||P
|-
|colspan=9|Forget that disgusting thing!
|}

Words can be reduplicated in order to express various differences in meaning. Nouns, for example, can be reduplicated to express collective or diminutive forms; adjectives so as to intensify or emphasize the associated description; and verbs in order to soften the degree of action. Below is an example of noun reduplication resulting in semantic alteration.
{|
|走||||走
|-
|tseu||-||tseu
|-
|walk||||walk
|-
|colspan=3|take a walk
|}

Word compounding is also very common in Shanghainese, a fact observed as far back as Edkins (1868), and is the most productive method of creating new words. Many recent borrowings in Shanghainese originating from European languages are di- or polysyllabic.

Word order 
Shanghainese adheres generally to SVO word order. The placement of objects in Wu dialects is somewhat variable, with Southern Wu varieties positioning the direct object before the indirect object, and Northern varieties (especially in the speech of younger people) favoring the indirect object before the direct object. Owing to Mandarin influence, Shanghainese usually follows the latter model.

Older speakers of Shanghainese tend to place adverbs after the verb, but younger people, again under heavy influence from Mandarin, favor pre-verbal placement of adverbs.

The third person singular pronoun  (yi) (he/she/it) or the derived phrase  (yi kaon) ("he says") can appear at the end of a sentence. This construction, which appears to be unique to Shanghainese, is commonly employed to project the speaker's differing expectation relative to the content of the phrase.
{|
|伊||伊講，||講||勿好。
|-
|yi||yi kaon||kaon||veq-hau
|-
|3s||he says||say||NEG-good
|-
|colspan=4|Unexpectedly, he says no.
|}

Nouns 
Except for the limited derivational processes described above, Shanghainese nouns are isolating. There is no inflection for case or number, nor is there any overt gender marking. Although Shanghainese does lack overt grammatical number, the plural marker  (la), when suffixed to a human denoting noun, can indicate a collective meaning.
{|
|學生||||拉||個||書
|-
|ghoq-sán||-||la||gheq||sý
|-
|student||||PL||POSS||book
|-
|colspan=5|students' books
|}

There are no articles in Shanghainese, and thus, no marking for definiteness or indefiniteness of nouns. Certain determiners (a demonstrative pronoun or numeral classifier, for instance) can imply definite or indefinite qualities, as can word order. A noun absent any sort of determiner in the subject position is definite, whereas it is indefinite in the object position.

{|
|老太婆||出來||了。
|-
|lau-tha-bu||tseq-le||leq
|-
|old lady||come.out||P
|-
|colspan=3|The old lady is coming out.
|}
{|
|來||朋友||了。
|-
|le||ban-yieu||leq
|-
|come||friend||P
|-
|colspan=3|Here comes a friend.
|}

Classifiers 
Shanghainese boasts numerous classifiers (also sometimes known as "counters" or "measure words"). Most classifiers in Shanghainese are used with nouns, although a small number are used with verbs. Some classifiers are based on standard measurements or containers. Classifiers can be paired with a preceding determiner (often a numeral) to form a compound that further specifies the meaning of the noun it modifies.
{|
|-
|搿||||隻||皮球
|-
|geq||-||tsaq||bi-jieu
|-
|this||||CL||ball
|-
|colspan=4|this ball
|}

Classifiers can be reduplicated to mean "all" or "every", as in:
{|
|-
|本||||本
|-
|pen||-||pen
|-
|colspan=3|(classifier for books)
|-
|colspan=3|every [book]
|}

Verbs 
Shanghainese verbs are analytic and as such do not undergo any sort of conjugation to express tense or person. However, the language does have a richly developed aspect system, expressed using various particles. This system has been argued to be a tense system.

Aspect 
Some disagreement exists as to how many formal aspect categories exist in Shanghainese, and a variety of different particles can express the same aspect, with individual usage often reflecting generational divisions. Some linguists identify as few as four or six, and others up to twelve specific aspects. Zhu (2006) identifies six relatively uncontroversial aspects in Shanghainese.

Progressive aspect expresses a continuous action.

{|
|伊||辣||做||功課||𠲎？
|-
|yi||laq||tsu||kón-khu||vaq
|-
|3s||PROG||do||homework||Q
|-
|colspan="5"|Is he doing his homework?
|}

{|
|本事||學||辣海||將來||派用場。
|-
|pen-sy||ghoq||laq-he||cián-le||pha-yon-zan
|-
|skill||learn||RES||future||take advantage
|-
|colspan="5"|Acquire the skill and take advantage of it later.
|}

{|
|衣裳||買||來||了。
|-
|í-zaon||ma||le||leq
|-
|clothes||buy||PFV||PF
|-
|colspan="4"|The clothes have been bought.
|}

Zhu (2006) identifies a future aspect, indicated by the particle  (iau).

{|
|明朝||要||落雨||個。
|-
|min-tsáu||iau||loq-yu||gheq
|-
|tomorrow||FUT||rain||P
|-
|colspan=4|It's going to rain tomorrow.
|}

{|
|電影||散場||快了。
|-
|di-in||se-zan||khua-leq
|-
|movie||finish||IMM.FUT P
|-
|colspan="3"|The movie is soon to finish.
|}

Experiential aspect expresses the completion of an action before a specifically referenced timeframe, marked post-verbally by the particle  (ku).

{|
|我||到||海裡||去||游泳||游過||五趟。
|-
|ngu||tau||he-li||chi||yeu-yon||yeu-ku||ng-thaon
|-
|1s||to||sea-inside||go||swim||swim-EXP||five-times
|-
|colspan="7"|I have swum the sea five times (so far).
|}

{|
|儂||就||讓||伊||做||下去||好了。
|-
|non||zhieu||gnian||yi||tsu||gho-chi||hau-leq
|-
|2s||even||let||3s||do||DUR||good-PF
|-
|colspan="7"|Please let him continue to do it.
|}

In some cases, it is possible to combine two aspect markers into a larger verb phrase.

{|
|-
|功課||做||好||快了。
|-
|kón-khu||tsu||hau||khua-leq
|-
|homework||do||PFV||IMM.FUT PF
|-
|colspan="4"|The homework will have been completed before long.
|}

Mood and Voice 
There is no overt marking for mood in Shanghainese, and Zhu (2006) goes so far as to suggest that the concept of grammatical mood does not exist in the language. There are, however, several modal auxiliaries (many of which have multiple variants) that collectively express concepts of desire, conditionality, potentiality and ability.

{|
|-
| "can" ||  (nen) /  (nen-keu) /  (hau)
|-
| "be able" ||  (ue) /  (ue-teq)
|-
| "may" ||  (khu-i)
|-
| "would like" ||  (iau)
|-
| "should" ||  (ín-ké)
|-
| "willing to" ||  (zhin-gnioe) /  (gnioe-i)
|-
| "happy to" ||  (káu-shin)
|-
| "want to" ||  (shian) /  (hau)
|}

Shen (2016) argues for the existence of a type of passive voice in Shanghainese, governed by the particle  (peq). This construction is superficially similar to by-phrases in English, and only transitive verbs can occur in this form of passive.

{|
|餅乾||撥||人家||吃脫了。
|-
|pin-kóe||peq||gnin-ká||chiq-theq-leq
|-
|biscuit||by||someone||eat-PERFECT
|-
|colspan="4"|The biscuits were eaten by someone.
|}

Pronouns 
Personal pronouns in Shanghainese do not distinguish gender or case. Owing to its isolating grammatical structure, Shanghainese is not a pro-drop language.

{| class="wikitable" style="text-align: center;"
|-
! || colspan="2" | Singular || Plural
|-
! rowspan="2" |1st person
| colspan="2" |我
|阿拉
|-
| colspan="2" |ngu||aq-laaq-laq
|-
! rowspan="2" |2nd person
|儂
|侬
|㑚
|-
| colspan="2" |non||na
|-
! rowspan="2" |3rd person
| colspan="2" |伊
|伊拉
|-
| colspan="2" |yi||yi-layi-laq
|}

There is some degree of flexibility concerning pronoun usage in Shanghainese. Older varieties of Shanghainese featured a different 1st person plural  (ngu-gni), whereas younger speakers tend to use  (aq-laq), which originates from Ningbonese. While Zhu (2006) asserts that there is no inclusive 1st person plural pronoun, Hashimoto (1971) disagrees, identifying  as being inclusive. There are generational and geographical distinctions in the usage of plural pronoun forms, as well as differences of pronunciation in the 1st person singular.

Reflexive pronouns are formed by the addition of the particle  (zy-ka), as in:

 {|
|伊||只好||怪||自家。
|-
|yi||tseq-hau||kua||zy-ka
|-
|he||can only||blame||self
|-
|colspan=4|He can only blame himself.
|}

Possessive pronouns are formed via the pronominal suffix  (gheq), for instance,  (ngu gheq). This pronunciation is a glottalised lenition of the expected pronunciation, ku.

Adjectives 
Most basic Shanghainese adjectives are monosyllabic. Like other parts of speech, adjectives do not change to indicate number, gender or case. Adjectives can take semantic prefixes, which themselves can be reduplicated or repositioned as suffixes according to a complex system of derivation, in order to express degree of comparison or other changes in meaning. Thus:
 lan ("cold")
 pín-lan ("ice-cold"), where  means ice
 pín-pín-lan ("cold as ice")

Interrogatives 
The particle  (vaq) is used to transform ordinary declarative statements into yes/no questions. This is the most common way of forming questions in Shanghainese.

{|
|儂||好||𠲎？
|-
|non||hau||vaq
|-
|2s||good||Q
|-
|colspan=3|How are you? ( "Are you good?")
|}

Negation 
Nouns and verbs can be negated by the verb  (m-meq), “to not have”, whereas   is the basic negator.
{|
|搿||勿是||檯子。
|-
|geq||veq-zy||de-tsy
|-
|this||NEG be||table
|-
|colspan=3|This is not a table.
|}

Writing 

Chinese characters are often used to write Shanghainese. Though there is no formal standardisations, there are characters recommended for use, mostly based on dictionaries. However, Shanghainese is often informally written using Shanghainese or even Standard Mandarin near-homophones. For instance "lemon", written  in Standard Chinese, may be written  (person-door; Pinyin: , Wugniu: gnin-men) in Shanghainese; and "yellow" (Wugniu: waon) may be written  (meaning king; Pinyin: , Wugniu: waon) rather than the standard character  for yellow.

Some of the time, nonstandard characters are used even when trying to use etymologically-correct characters, due to compatibility (such as ) or pronunciation shift (such as ).

Correct orthography according to 

Mandarin-influenced orthography

Romanization of Shanghainese was first developed by Protestant English and American Christian missionaries in the 19th century, including Joseph Edkins. Usage of this romanization system was mainly confined to translated Bibles for use by native Shanghainese, or English–Shanghainese dictionaries, some of which also contained characters, for foreign missionaries to learn Shanghainese. A system of phonetic symbols similar to Chinese characters called "New Phonetic Character" were also developed by in the 19th century by American missionary Tarleton Perry Crawford. Since the 21st century, online dictionaries such as the Wu MiniDict and Wugniu have introduced their own Romanization schemes. Nowadays, the MiniDict and Wugniu Romanizations are the most commonly used standardised ones.

Protestant missionaries in the 1800s created the Shanghainese Phonetic Symbols to write Shanghainese phonetically. The symbols are a syllabary similar to the Japanese kana system. The system has not been used and is only seen in a few historical books.

See also 

Shanghainese people
Haipai
Wu Chinese
Suzhounese
Hangzhounese
Ningbonese
List of varieties of Chinese
Chinatown, Flushing

References

Citations

Sources 
 Lance Eccles, Shanghai dialect: an introduction to speaking the contemporary language. Dunwoody Press, 1993. . 230 pp + cassette. (An introductory course in 29 units).
 Xiaonong Zhu, A Grammar of Shanghai Wu. LINCOM Studies in Asian Linguistics 66, LINCOM Europa, Munich, 2006. . 201+iv pp.

Further reading 
 
 
 
 
 
 
 
 
 
 
 Pott, F. L. Hawks (Francis Lister Hawks), 1864–1947 | The ...
 
 
 
 
 
 "Shanghai steps up efforts to save local language" (Archive). CNN. March 31, 2011.

External links 

Shanghainese audio lesson series: Audio lessons with accompanying dialogue and vocabulary study tools
Shanghai Dialect: Resources on Shanghai dialect including a Web site (in Japanese) that gives common phrases with sound files
Wu Association
IAPSD | International Association for Preservation of the Shanghainese Dialect
Recordings of Shanghainese are available through Kaipuleohone, including talking about entertainment and food, and words and sentences

 
Wu Chinese
Culture in Shanghai
Languages of China
Languages of Taiwan
Languages of Hong Kong
Languages of the United States
Languages of Canada
City colloquials